This list covers television programs whose first letter (excluding "the") of the title is S.

S

SA
Sábado Gigante
Sabado Sensacional
Sabrina: The Animated Series
Sabrina: Secrets of a Teenage Witch
The Sabrina the Teenage Witch Show
Sabrina the Teenage Witch
Sabrina's Secret Life
Sacred Games
The Saddle Club
Sadie J
Sadie Sparks
Sailor Moon
The Saint
Saint George
Sale of the Century
Salem's Lot (1979)
Salem's Lot (2004)
Sally (1957)
Sally (1983)
The Salt-N-Pepa Show
Salute Your Shorts
Sam (1973)
Sam (1978)
Samantha Who?
Sam & Cat
Sammy's Story Shop
The Samurai (Japan)
Samurai Champloo
Samurai Girl
Samurai Jack
Sancharam
Sanctuary
The Sandbaggers (British)
The Sandy Duncan Show
Sanford and Son
Sanjay and Craig
Santa Clarita Diet
Santiago of the Seas
Sapphire & Steel
Sarah & Duck
The Sarah Jane Adventures
Sasuke (Japan)
Satisfaction (Australia, 2007)
Satisfaction (Canada, 2013)
Satisfaction (U.S., 2014)
Saturday Night Live
Saturday Night Live Weekend Update Thursday
Saturday Night's Main Event
Saul of the Mole Men
Savannah
Saved by the Bell
Saved by the Bell: The College Years
Saved by the Bell: The New Class
Save My Life: Boston Trauma
The Save-Ums! (Canada)
Saving Grace
Saving Hope (Canada)
Say Yes to the Dress
Say Yes to the Dress: Atlanta
Say Yes to the Dress: Australia 
Say Yes to the Dress: Bridesmaids
Say Yes to the Dress: Randy Knows Best

SC
Scandal
Scandal: A Shocking and Wrongful Incident (South Korea)
Scarecrow and Mrs. King
Scaredy Squirrel (TV series)
Scare Tactics
Scattergories
Schitt's Creek
Schlitz Playhouse of Stars
Schooled
Schoolhouse Rock!
School of Rock
Science Fiction Theatre
Scientific American Frontiers
Scooby-Doo! Mystery Incorporated
Scooby-Doo and Scrappy-Doo (1979)
Scooby-Doo and Scrappy-Doo (1980)
The Scooby-Doo Show
Scooby-Doo, Where Are You! (1969)
Scoop and Doozie
Scorpion
Scotland Today
The Scott and Gary Show
Scott the Woz
Scrabble
Scream
Scream Queens (2008)
Scream Queens (2015)
Screen Play (AU) (2019)
Scrubs
Scruff

SE
Sea Hunt
Sealab 2020
Sealab 2021
Sea Monsters (UK)
Sea Princesses (Brazil/Australia)
seaQuest DSV
Search
Search Party
Search for Tomorrow
Season 25: Oprah Behind The Scenes
SEC Storied
Second Chance
Second City Television (SCTV)
Second Verdict (UK)
Second Wives Club
Secret Agent
Secret Diary of a Call Girl
Secrets of Sulphur Springs
The Secret Life of the American Teenager
Secret Lives of the Super Rich
The Secret Millionaire
Secret Millionaires Club
The Secret Saturdays
The Secret Service (UK)
The Secret Show
The Secret World of Alex Mack
Secrets of the Cryptkeeper's Haunted House
The Secrets of Isis
Secrets & Lies (Australia)
Secrets and Lies (US)
Secrets and Wives
See
See Dad Run
Seeing Things
See It Now
Seinfeld
Seiren (2017, Japan)
Selector Infected WIXOSS
Selena + Chef
Selfie
Sell This House
Selling New York
Sense8
The Sentimental Agent
The Sentinel
Seoige (Ireland)
Separation Anxiety
Sergeant Cork
Sergeant Preston of the Yukon
A Series of Unfortunate Events
Seriously Weird
Sesame Street
Set for Life
Seven Little Monsters
The Seventies
Severance
Sex (Australia)
Sex and the City
The Sex Lives of College Girls
Sex Rehab with Dr. Drew
Sex Sent Me to the ER
Sex with Brody

SH
Shades of Blue
Shadow and Bone
Shadowhunters
Shaggy & Scooby-Doo Get a Clue!
Shahs of Sunset
Shake It Up (US)
Shake It Up (India)
Shaman King
Shameless (UK)
Shameless (US)
Sha Na Na
The Shannara Chronicles
Shark (South Korea)
Shark (US)
Shark Tank (Australia)
Shark Tank (US)
Sharp Objects
Shaun The Sheep
Shazam!
Shazzan
She-Hulk: Attorney at Law
She-Ra and the Princesses of Power
She-Ra: Princess of Power
Sheep in the Big City
Sheriff Callie's Wild West
Sherlock (UK)
Sherlock Homes (1951) (BBC)
Sherlock Holmes (1954) (US)
Sherlock Holmes (1965) (BBC)
Sherlock Homes (1967) (Germany)
Sherlock Holmes (1968) (Italy)
Sherlock Holmes (1984) (Britain)
Sherlock Homes (2013) (Russia)
Sherlock Holmes in the 22nd Century
Sherlock Holmes and Doctor Watson (BBC)
Sherri
SheZow
She's the Sheriff
The Shield
Shimmer and Shine
Shindig!
Shine On with Reese
$#*! My Dad Says
Shoestring (BBC)
Shoot for the Stars
Shooter
Shop 'Til You Drop
A Shot at Love with Tila Tequila
Showbiz Tonight
Shower of Stars
Showmatch (Argentina)
Show Me the Money (US)
Showtime at the Apollo
Showtime Championship Boxing
The Show with Vinny
Shuriken School

SI
Siberi

Sidekick (Canada)
Sidewalks Entertainment
Sidewalks: Video Nite
Sid the Science Kid
Sierra
Siesta Key
Silent Library
The Silent Years
Silicon Valley
Silk Stalkings
The Silver Guardian (China-Japan)
Silver Spoons
Simon & Simon
The Simple Life
The Simpsons
Sinais de Vida
Sing Along with Mitch
Sing If You Can (UK)
The Singing Bee
Single Parents
Singled Out
The Sinner
Sir Arthur Conan Doyle's The Lost World
Sir Francis Drake
Siren
Sirens
SiS (Philippines)
Sister Kate
Sister, Sister
Sister Wives
Sisterhood of Hip Hop
Sisters
Sit Down, Shut Up
Sitting Ducks
The Situation Room with Wolf Blitzer
Six
Six Degrees
Six Feet Under
The Six Million Dollar Man
The Six Wives of Henry VIII
The Sixties

SK
SK8-TV
Skam (Norway)
Skating with Celebrities
Skating with the Stars
Skin
Skinnamarink TV
Skins (UK)
Skins (US)
Skin Wars
Skip and Shannon: Undisputed
Skippy the Bush Kangaroo (Australia)
Ski Sunday (UK) 
Skunk Fu 
Sky Dancers
Sky King
Sky News Today (UK)
Skyland
Skylanders Academy

SL
Sledge hammer
Sleeper Cell
Sleepy Hollow
SLiDE
Slide Hustle
Sliders
Slings and Arrows
Slugterra

SM
Smack the Pony
Small Fry Club
Smallville
Small Wonder
Smart Guy
Smash
Smiling Friends
The Smothers Brothers Comedy Hour
The Smurfs

SN
Snap Decision
Snapped
Snapped: Killer Couples
Snapped: She Made Me Do It
Snooki & Jwoww
Snorks
Snowdrop (South Korea)
Snowfall
Snowpiercer

SO
Soap
So Awkward
So Cosmo
Sofia the First
Softly, Softly
Softly, Softly: Taskforce (BBC)
Solid Gold
So Little Time
Solstrom (Canada)
Some Assembly Required (US) (2007)
Some Assembly Required (Canada) (2014)
Somebody's Gotta Do It
Somerset
Something Is Out There
Something So Right
Soñando por Bailar (Argentina)
Songland
Songs of Praise (UK)
Sonic Boom
Sonic the Hedgehog
Sonic Underground
Sonic X
The Sonny & Cher Comedy Hour
Sonny with a Chance
Son of the Bride
Sono 'Okodawari', Watashi ni mo Kure yo!!
Sons and Daughters
Sons of Anarchy
Sooty and Sweep
The Sopranos
So Random!
Soul Train
The Soup
Southern at Heart
Southern Charm
Southern Charm New Orleans
Southland
South of Nowhere
South Park
So Weird
So You Think You Can Dance (US)

SP
Space: 1999
Space: Above and Beyond
Space Academy
Space Angel
Space Battleship Yamato
Space Cases
Spaced
Spaceghost
Space Ghost Coast to Coast
Space Goofs
The Space Gypsy Adventures
Space Patrol (1950)
Space Patrol (1962)
Space Pirates (UK)
Space Racers
Space Rangers
 Spaceballs The Animated Series
Spartakus and the Sun Beneath the Sea
Special Agent Oso
The Spectacular Spider-Man
Speechless
Speed Buggy
Speed Racer
Speed Racer: The Next Generation
Spellbinder
Spellbinder: Land of the Dragon Lord
Spenser: For Hire
Spender (BBC)
Spice and Wolf
Spider-Man (1967)
Spider-Man (1981)
Spider-Man (1994)
Spider-Man: The New Animated Series
Spidey and His Amazing Friends
Spin City
Spin the Wheel
Spirit Riding Free
Spiritpact (China)
Splash! (UK)
Splash (US)
Splash and Bubbles
Splatalot! (Australia)
Splatalot! (Canada)
Splatalot! (US)
Splatalot! (UK)
Spliced (Canada)
Splitting Up Together
SpongeBob SquarePants
Spooks
Spooksville
SportsCenter
SportsCentre (Canada)
Sports Jeopardy! 
SportsNation
Sportsnight (BBC)
Sports Night (US)
SportsNight with James Bracey (Australia)
Sport Relief (UK)
Sport Relief Does The Apprentice (UK)
The Sports Reporters
Sports Tonight (Australia)
Spring Break Challenge
Springwatch (BBC)
Spy
Spyforce (Australia)
Spy Game
Spy Groove
Spy Kids: Mission Critical

SQ
Squad Wars
Square One Television
Square Pegs
Squidbillies
Squid Game
Squirrel Boy

ST
Stacked
Stage Show
Stagecoach West
The Stagers
Standoff
Stanley
Star
Star Blazers
Starface
Star Falls
Star vs. the Forces of Evil
Stargate Atlantis
Stargate Infinity
Stargate SG-1
Stargate Universe
Stark Raving Mad
 Star Beam
Starman
Star Search
Stars Earn Stripes
Starsky and Hutch
Starstuff
Star Trek: The Animated Series
Star Trek: The Original Series
Star Trek: Deep Space Nine
Star Trek: Discovery
Star Trek: Enterprise
Star Trek: Lower Decks
Star Trek: Picard
Star Trek: Prodigy
Star Trek: Short Treks
Star Trek: Strange New Worlds
Star Trek: The Next Generation
Star Trek: Voyager
Star Wars: The Bad Batch
Star Wars: Clone Wars
Star Wars: The Clone Wars (2008)
Star Wars: Droids
Star Wars: Ewoks
Star Wars Forces of Destiny
Star Wars Rebels
Star Wars Resistance
Star Wars Visions
Stat
The State
State of Grace
State of the Union
Staten Island Law
Stath Lets Flats
Static Shock
Station 19
Station Eleven
Stay Lucky
Steins;Gate
Stella (UK)
Stella (US)
Stella and Sam
St. Elsewhere
Step by Step
Steptoe and Son
Steve
The Steve Allen Show
Steve Austin's Broken Skull Challenge
Steve Harvey
The Steve Harvey Show
Steve Harvey's Big Time Challenge
Steve Harvey's Funderdome
Steven Universe
The Steve Wilkos Show
Stickin' Around
Still the King
Still Standing
Still Star-Crossed
Stingray (UK, 1964)
Stingray (USA, 1985)
Stir
Stitchers
Stoked
Storage Hunters
Storage Wars
Storage Wars: Canada
Storage Wars: Miami
Storage Wars: New York
Storage Wars: Texas
Storefront Lawyers
Storm Chasers
Storm Hawks
Storybook Squares
Story of Yanxi Palace
The Storyteller
Strahan and Sara
Straightaway
The Strain
Strange Days at Blake Holsey High (aka "Black Hole High")
Strange Love
Strange Report
Stranger Things
Strangers with Candy
Strawberry Shortcake
Strawberry Shortcake's Berry Bitty Adventures
Street Legal (Canada)
Street Legal (New Zealand)
Street Smarts
The Streets of San Francisco
Stressed Eric
Strictly Come Dancing (South Africa)
Strictly Come Dancing (UK)
Strictly Come Dancing: It Takes Two (UK)
Strike Back
Strike Force
Strike It Rich (1950)
Strike It Rich (1986)
Stroker and Hoop
Strömsö
Strong Medicine
Stuck in the Middle
Student Bodies
Studio 7
Studio 60 on the Sunset Strip
Studio One

SU
Suburgatory
The Substitute
Suddenly Susan
Succession
Sugarfoot
The Suite Life of Zack & Cody
The Suite Life on Deck
Suits
Sukeban Deka
Summer Camp Island
Summer Heights High
Summer House (2006)
Summer House (2017)
Summerland
The Sunday Comics
Sunday NFL Countdown
Sunday Night Baseball
Sunday Night with Megyn Kelly
Sunny Day
Sun Records
Sunrise (UK)
Supa Strikas
Supah Ninjas
The Super
Superboy
Superbook
Supercar (UK)
Super Dave
Super Friends
Supergirl
Super Gran (UK)
Super Greed
Superior Donuts
Super Jeopardy!
Superman (1988)
SuperMansion
Superman: The Animated Series
The Super Mario Bros. Super Show!
Super Mario World
Super Monsters
Supermarket Sweep
Supernanny
Supernatural (UK)
Supernatural (US)
Supernoobs
Super Password
Super President
Super Robot Monkey Team Hyperforce Go!
Super Soul Sunday
Superstars
Superstars of Wrestling
Superstore
Supertrain 
Super Why!
Super Wings
Surfside Six
Surprise with Jenny McCarthy
Surprise Surprise (UK)
The Surreal Life
The Surreal Life: Fame Games
Survivor
Survivor (US)
Survivorman (Canada)
Survivors (1975)
Survivors (2008)
Sutherland's Law (BBC 1973–76)

SW
Swamp Thing
The Swan
Swans Crossing
S.W.A.T. (1975)
S.W.A.T. (2017)
SWAT Kats: The Radical Squadron
Swedish Dicks
Sweet and Sour
Sweet Home
Sweet Life: Los Angeles
Sweet Valley High
Sweet/Vicious
Swerved
Swingtown
Switch (1975) (US)
Switch (2012) (UK)
Switched at Birth
The Swiss Family Robinson (US)
Sword Art Online
Sword of Freedom

SY
 Sydney to the Max
 Sylvester and Tweety Mysteries
 Sym-Bionic Titan

Previous:  List of television programs: Q-R    Next:  List of television programs: T